Edith Pauline Alderman (January 16, 1893 – October 11, 1983) was an American musicologist and composer. She was the founder and the first Chairwoman of the Department of Music History and Literature (musicology) at the University of Southern California, between 1952 and 1960.

Biography

Early life and education
Alderman was born in Lafayette, Oregon and received training in piano and organ, as well as in English and German literature in her youth. She graduated from Washington High School in Portland, Oregon. Her first teaching career started at the McMinnville junior high school in 1916 where she taught English literature. Alderman further taught history and music in Portland and attended summer music classes at the University of California, Berkeley in Berkeley, California in 1918. Between 1920 and 1923 she became a student of Carolyn Alchin, while she was teaching at the Ellison-White Conservatory of Music, then newly founded conservatory in Portland.

Alderman attended New York Institute of Musical Art (later Juilliard School of Music), where she was a student of Percy Goetschius, in 1923. A year later, she started to teach piano, music theory and history of music at the Pomona College in Claremont, California. Later, from 1928 to 1930, she taught at the University of Washington, then music and literature at the University of Southern California (USC) in Los Angeles, where she earned her Ph.D. degree. Alderman had classes with Arnold Schönberg.

Later life and death
She moved to Europe in 1938, where she decided to take lessons from Donald Francis Tovey at the University of Edinburgh. She moved to at the University of Strasbourg for doctoral studies. She returned to Los Angeles in 1940, where she was back teaching at the University of Southern California (USC). While teaching, she had composition lessons with Ernst Toch and Lucien Cailliet. Alderman presented her dissertation at USC which she named Antoine Boësset and the Air de Cour and in 1946 she received the first PhD regree in music at USC.  In 1952, she became the first Chairwoman of the Department of Music History and Literature which she founded, until her retirement in 1960.  She died in Los Angeles, California.

Legacy
Quote from the USC publication Musicology at USC, A Handbook for Graduate Students 2007–2008:

In addition to her songs, Alderman composed an opera Bombasto Furioso (1938) and the operetta Come On Over (1940), which won the ASCAP Award for 1940, the first time the prize was won by a woman.

The International Congress on Women in Music sponsored by International Alliance for Women in Music has established the Pauline Alderman Award for musicological and journalistic works on women in music in 1982.

Alderman’s students included composer Williametta Spencer.

Works
 Antoine Boesset and the Air de Cour, Dissertation, 1946
 A Survey of Vocal Literature (1952)
 Theme and Variations (1943–45)
 Pioneers of Music (1950)
 We Build a School of Music (1989) (For all intents, a rousing autobiography centered on her years at the School of Music.)

References

Further reading

1893 births
1983 deaths
20th-century classical composers
Alumni of the University of Edinburgh
American women composers
Educators from Portland, Oregon
American women educators
Ellison-White Conservatory of Music faculty
Juilliard School alumni
People from Lafayette, Oregon
Pomona College faculty
Pupils of Percy Goetschius
USC Thornton School of Music alumni
University of California, Berkeley alumni
University of California, Berkeley faculty
American women musicologists
University of Southern California faculty
University of Strasbourg alumni
University of Washington faculty
Washington High School (Portland, Oregon) alumni
20th-century American women musicians
20th-century American musicians
20th-century American composers
20th-century American musicologists
20th-century women composers